Dusun Tua is a small village in Hulu Langat district, Selangor, Malaysia.

Hulu Langat District
Villages in Selangor